German submarine U-338 was a Type VIIC U-boat of Nazi Germany's Kriegsmarine during World War II. The submarine was laid down on 4 April 1941 at the Nordseewerke yard at Emden, launched on 20 April 1942, and commissioned on 25 June 1942 under the command of Oberleutnant zur See Manfred Kinzel.

Design
German Type VIIC submarines were preceded by the shorter Type VIIB submarines. U-338 had a displacement of  when at the surface and  while submerged. She had two shafts and two  propellers.

U-338 was fitted with five  torpedo tubes (four fitted at the bow and one at the stern), fourteen torpedoes, one  SK C/35 naval gun, 220 rounds, and a  C/30 anti-aircraft gun. The boat had a complement of between forty-four and sixty.

Service history
U-338 was nicknamed Wildesel ("Wild Donkey") after an incident on the day of its launch, when the U-boat broke free from its moorings and struck a small tug boat, sinking it. After training with the 8th U-boat Flotilla at Danzig, U-338 was transferred to the 7th U-boat Flotilla for front-line service on 1 March 1943.

First patrol
U-338 sailed from Kiel on 23 February 1943 under the command of Kapitänleutnant Manfred Kinzel, and out into the north Atlantic where she joined the wolfpack 'Stürmer' on 11 March for an attack on Convoy SC 122. On 17 March at 03:05, U-338 fired two torpedoes at the convoy southeast of Cape Farewell, Greenland and hit and sank two British merchant ships; the 4,898 GRT Kingsbury, and the 5,072 GRT King Gruffydd. After a minute, two more torpedoes were fired, one of which struck the 7,886 GRT Dutch merchantman Alderamin, which later sank. A single torpedo was then fired from the stern tube aimed at the Alderamin, but it missed and struck the 7,134 GRT British merchant ship Fort Cedar Lake. The ship, badly damaged, fell behind the convoy and was sunk by  around noon. U-338 attacked the convoy again at 14:52 with another salvo of torpedoes, one of which hit the 4,071 GRT Panama-registered American ship Granville, which broke in two amidships and sank within 15 minutes.

On 22 March 1943, U-338 was in the Bay of Biscay, heading for its new home port of Saint-Nazaire in France, when it was attacked by a British Halifax bomber from No. 502 Squadron RAF. Anti-aircraft fire from the submarine hit the starboard outer engine and fuselage of the aircraft, causing its bombs to fall wide and cause only slight damage to the U-boat. The aircraft was seen to crash into the sea some distance away, killing all but one of the eight-man crew, who was picked up by U-338 and taken prisoner. Two days later, on 24 March, the U-boat arrived at St. Nazaire.

Second patrol
U-338 sailed from St. Nazaire on 15 June 1943, but the patrol was cut short when she was attacked on the 17th by a B-17 Flying Fortress from No. 206 Squadron RAF. The U-boat was damaged, the Obersteuermann ("Navigator") killed, and three men were wounded. The U-boat returned to port on 21 June.

Third patrol and loss
U-338 sailed from St. Nazaire again on 25 August 1943 into the mid-Atlantic, joining the wolfpack 'Leuthen' on 15 September. The U-boat was lost on 20 September during an attack on Convoy ON 202. After being spotted by a B-24 Liberator patrol aircraft, the Canadian corvette  approached at speed firing her 4-inch gun. The U-boat dived, and was located by Drumhellers ASDIC (sonar). As the corvette prepared to attack with depth charges she observed a large underwater explosion. No further contact with U-338 was made, and it is assumed that she was destroyed as a result of damage caused by Drumhellers shell fire.

Previously recorded fate
U-338 was originally thought to have been sunk on 20 September 1943 southwest of Iceland at position  by a homing torpedo
from a British B-24 Liberator of Squadron 120/F. This attack was actually against , inflicting no damage.

Summary of raiding history

References

Bibliography

External links

Missing U-boats of World War II
World War II submarines of Germany
German Type VIIC submarines
U-boats commissioned in 1942
U-boats sunk in 1943
1942 ships
Ships built in Emden
U-boats sunk by unknown causes
Maritime incidents in September 1943